Presidential elections were held in Bulgaria on 27 October 1996, with a second round on 3 November. The result was a victory for Petar Stoyanov of the United Democratic Forces, who won 59.7% of the vote in the second round. Voter turnout was 63.3% in the first round and 61.8% in the second.

Results

References

Bulgaria
President
Presidential elections in Bulgaria
October 1996 events in Europe
November 1996 events in Europe